Anass Houssein (born 10 January 1995) is a Djiboutian judoka. 

He competed at the 2016 Summer Olympics in Rio de Janeiro, in the men's 66 kg, where he lost to Ma Duanbin in the second round.

References

1995 births
Living people
Djiboutian male judoka
Olympic judoka of Djibouti
Judoka at the 2016 Summer Olympics